Edgemont Park is a census-designated place (CDP) in Ingham County in the U.S. state of Michigan. It is located within Lansing Charter Township. The population was 2,358 at the 2010 census.

Geography
The community is bordered to the east and the north by the city of Lansing, to the south by Saginaw Street (M-43), and to the west by the community of Waverly in Eaton County. Part of the northern border of Edgemont Park follows the Grand River.

Demographics

As of the census of 2000, there were 2,442 people, 1,081 households, and 700 families residing in the CDP. The racial makeup of the CDP was 85.09% White, 7.53% Black or African American, 0.49% Native American, 0.86% Asian, 0.04% Pacific Islander, 2.95% from other races, and 3.03% from two or more races. Hispanic or Latino of any race were 6.72% of the population.

There were 1,081 households, out of which 29.6% had children under the age of 18 living with them, 48.0% were married couples living together, 13.9% had a female householder with no husband present, and 35.2% were non-families. 30.2% of all households were made up of individuals, and 10.9% had someone living alone who was 65 years of age or older.  The average household size was 2.23 and the average family size was 2.76.

In the CDP, the population was spread out, with 24.3% under the age of 18, 7.9% from 18 to 24, 28.7% from 25 to 44, 20.8% from 45 to 64, and 18.3% who were 65 years of age or older.  The median age was 37 years. For every 100 females, there were 86.3 males.  For every 100 females age 18 and over, there were 80.7 males.

The median income for a household in the CDP was $43,173, and the median income for a family was $54,566. Males had a median income of $39,474 versus $28,750 for females. The per capita income for the CDP was $23,981.  About 4.9% of families and 5.5% of the population were below the poverty line, including 7.0% of those under age 18 and 4.2% of those age 65 or over.

References

Unincorporated communities in Ingham County, Michigan
Census-designated places in Michigan
Lansing–East Lansing metropolitan area
Unincorporated communities in Michigan
Census-designated places in Ingham County, Michigan